Joe Hanson may refer to:
Joe Hanson (soccer) (born 2003), Canadian football player
Joe Hanson, birth name of Lily Hanson, comedian

See also
Joseph Hansen (disambiguation)